Greatest Hits is a compilation album from the American progressive metal band Queensrÿche, released in 2000. It includes material from all of the band's studio releases up to 1997 (1999's Q2K is excluded), as well as the 1997 B-side "Chasing Blue Sky" and an alternate version of "Someone Else?" featuring the full band.

Track listing

Charts

References

2000 greatest hits albums
Queensrÿche compilation albums
Capitol Records compilation albums